Queen Anne's County High School (QACHS) is a four-year public high school in Centreville, Queen Anne's County, Maryland, United States. It is one of two public high schools in Queen Anne's County along with Kent Island High School.

Overview
The school is located on the Eastern Shore of Maryland in the town of Centreville, MD.  The school is on Maryland Route 304, south of Maryland Route 305, east of Maryland Route 213, and west of U.S. Route 301.  The current building was built in 1966.

The school was created with the desegregation of the school system in 1966, twelve years after Brown vs. Board of Education was ruled.  The high school for African Americans, the Kennard School, was closed and turned into the present Kennard Elementary School.  The three White schools - Centreville High School, Sudlersville High School, and Stevensville High School - were closed and turned into middle schools.

The current principal is Mrs. Amy Hudock.

Students

Sports
State Champions

 2021 - Women’s Lacrosse
 2010 - Boys' Lacrosse 
 2009 - Swimming
 1978 - Baseball 

State Finalist

 Boys' Swimming- 2014
 Boys' Track & Field- 1985, 2012  
 Girls' Lacrosse- 2012
Boys' Ballet- 2010
 Boys' Soccer- 2012
 Ice Hockey (Co-Opp)- 2012
 Boys' Lacrosse- 2009
 Football- 2009
 Girls' Soccer- 2003  

State Semi-Finalist

 Girls' Lacrosse- 2007, 09, 10, 13, 14
 Field Hockey- 2011
 Boys' Lacrosse-1999, 2011
 Girls' Lacrosse-2011
 Football-2004, 08, 10  
 Boys' Soccer- 1974, 1975, 2005, 06  
 Girls' Soccer- 2004
 Boys' Lacrosse-1999, 2000 
 Unisex Badminton-1966

State Quarter-Finalist

 Football- 1985, 1999

See also
List of high schools in Maryland
Queen Anne's County Public Schools

References and notes

http://qacps.schoolwires.net/qhs

External links
Queen Anne's County High School website
Map of School from Google Maps

Public high schools in Maryland
Educational institutions established in 1966
Schools in Queen Anne's County, Maryland
1966 establishments in Maryland